Gawalmandi Food Street (Sarak-e-Khorak Gwolmandi) is a food street located near Gawalmandi neighbourhood of Lahore, Punjab, Pakistan. Historically it was a posh place and many of the families that migrated to Lahore from Amritsar and nearby cities, after the creation of Pakistan, settled in Gawalmandi. A lack of employment opportunities lead many of them to open up small shops in front of their houses. The migrating families brought along with them new and unique cuisine and recipes, laying the foundation a street well known for its great food.

See also 

 Lahori cuisine
 Fort Road Food Street
 List of restaurant districts and streets

References

External links
 Pakistani Food Places
 YouTube Video about Food Street
 Short YouTube Video

Lahori cuisine
Pakistani cuisine
Restaurant districts and streets in Pakistan
Street food in Pakistan
Streets in Lahore
Tourist attractions in Lahore
Restaurants in Lahore